Sonamura is one of the 60 Legislative Assembly constituencies of Tripura state in India. It is in Sipahijala district and a part of West Tripura Lok Sabha constituency.

Members of Legislative Assembly

 1972: Debendra Choudhury, Indian National Congress
 1977: Subal Rudra, Communist Party of India (Marxist)
 1983: Rashik Lal Roy, Indian National Congress
 1988: Rashik Lal Roy, Indian National Congress
 1993: Subal Rudra, Communist Party of India (Marxist)
 1998: Subal Rudra, Communist Party of India (Marxist)
 2003: Subal Rudra, Communist Party of India (Marxist)
 2008: Subal Bhowmik, Indian National Congress
 2013: Shyamal Chakraborty, Communist Party of India (Marxist)

Election results

2018

See also
List of constituencies of the Tripura Legislative Assembly
 Sipahijala district
 Sonamura
 Tripura West (Lok Sabha constituency)

References

Sipahijala district
Assembly constituencies of Tripura